"Got 2 Have Ya" is the debut single by British pop girl group Solid HarmoniE. The song was released in 1996 by Ultrapop as an eventual non-album track. It was written by Alex Trime, Sven Jordan, Heavenli Abdi and Gary Carolla. It was produced by Trime'n DELgado.

Commercial performance
"Got 2 Have Ya" was merely released in Germany under the Edel sublabel Ultrapop. It did not chart in the German monthly singles charts in 1996. Despite this it was included on two compilation albums in Germany, namely Bravo Hits 15 and Hot Hits, both released late 1996.

Music video
The music video accompanying the track was shot partially in black and white and partially in colour. The colour segments of the music video feature the members performing between mannequins and disco lights. The black and white segments show the girls judging men, which they all reject after careful consideration, in the auspicious of three men in suits. At the end of the video a waiter in the back drops a glass bottle, catching the attention of the girls. The girls decide to pick him after which Mariama kisses one of the suited men goodbye.

Formats and track listings

Release history

References 

1996 songs
1996 debut singles
Solid HarmoniE songs